Breiddalsvatnet is a lake in Skjåk Municipality in Innlandet county, Norway. The  lake lies just west of the village of Grotli. The Norwegian National Road 15 runs along the north side of the lake. The mountains Helleggi and Krosshø are located just north of the lake and the Breheimen National Park lies just south of the lake.

See also
List of lakes in Norway

References

Skjåk
Lakes of Innlandet